The Battle of Sinsheim took place on 16 June 1674 during the 1672-1678 Franco-Dutch War. An Imperial force commanded by Aeneas de Caprara was marching towards Heidelberg, in order to join their main army under Alexander von Bournonville. It was intercepted just outside Sinsheim by the French commanded by Turenne; the Imperialists repulsed the first two French assaults but were eventually forced to retreat.

Background
When the Franco-Dutch War began in May 1672, French troops quickly over-ran much of the Republic, but by July the Dutch position had stabilised. In addition, the unexpected success of his offensive encouraged Louis to make excessive demands, while concern at French gains brought the Dutch support from Brandenburg-Prussia, Emperor Leopold, and Charles II of Spain. In August 1673, the French army in the Rhineland under Turenne was faced by Imperial forces under Raimondo Montecuccoli who outmanoeuvred his opponent and helped the Dutch in capture Bonn. Facing war on multiple fronts, Louis relinquished most of his earlier gains to consolidate his position along the French border with the Spanish Netherlands and in the Rhineland.

In January 1674, Denmark joined the anti-French coalition, followed by the February Treaty of Westminster, which ended the Third Anglo-Dutch War. The allies agreed to focus on expelling France from its remaining positions in the Netherlands, while an Imperial army opened a second front in Alsace. Louis appointed Turenne commander in Alsace and ordered him to prevent the Imperials breaking into Eastern France, or linking up with the Dutch. Since he could not expect reinforcements, the longer Turenne delayed, the worse his position became, and so he decided to take the offensive. He was helped in this since French armies of the period held significant advantages over their opponents; undivided command, talented generals, and vastly superior logistics. Reforms introduced by Louvois, the Secretary of War, meant they could mobilise much more quickly than their adversaries, and campaign for longer.

The main French objectives for 1674 were to retake Franche-Comté and key fortresses along their border with the Spanish Netherlands. Turenne was tasked with preventing the Imperialists entering Alsace but decided the best way to do that was to attack. On 14 June, he crossed the Rhine near Philippsburg, seeking to intercept an Imperial force under Aeneas de Caprara before it could link up with Alexander von Bournonville. On 16 June, Turenne caught Caprara outside Sinsheim and brought him to battle.

The battle

Caprara aligned his infantry along the hedgerows and gardens at the entrance of the village.

Turenne deployed his infantry and his dragoons on foot. They forced the outposts, crossed the Elsanz and entered Sinsheim. The Imperials retreated through the village and fell back on the plateau behind the village.

To reach the plateau, the French had to climb a narrow passage. Turenne positioned infantry and dragoons in the hedgerows flanking the narrow passage, as well as in the castle and in the vineyard. The French cavalry could then advance through the passage.

An enemy counter-attack was stopped by the covering fire of the French infantry. The Imperials were repelled from the plateau and withdrew. Turenne immediately left Sinsheim to monitor the bulk of the Imperial army, stationed on the Moselle.

There were 2,000 to 3,000 deaths, according to sources. The city was completely destroyed.

Aftermath
The battle was only a limited success for Turenne, because both enemy forces succeeded in uniting near Heidelberg.
On 1 July the Elector of Brandenburg also took up arms against France, and the Perpetual Diet of Regensburg declared war.

Turenne again crossed the Rhine and ravaged the Palatinate (July 1674), depriving the Imperials the resources to attack the Alsace.

References

Sources
 
 
 
 
 
 
 ;
 
 

 

Sinsheim
Sinsheim
Sinsheim
Sinsheim
1674 in the Holy Roman Empire
Franco-Dutch War